Tomoaki Kunichika (born April 22, 1973 in Yamaguchi) is a male long-distance runner from Japan, who won the 2003 edition of the Fukuoka Marathon, clocking 2:07:52 on December 7, 2003.

Achievements

References

 sports-reference

1973 births
Living people
Sportspeople from Yamaguchi Prefecture
Japanese male long-distance runners
Japanese male marathon runners
Olympic male marathon runners
Olympic athletes of Japan
Athletes (track and field) at the 2004 Summer Olympics
Japan Championships in Athletics winners
20th-century Japanese people
21st-century Japanese people